The 1993–94 Elitnaya Liga season was the second season of the Elitnaya Liga, the second-level of ice hockey in Russia. 13 teams participated in the league, and CSK VVS Samara won the league championship.

Regular season

External links
 Season on hockeyarchives.info
 Season hockeyarchives.ru

2
Russian Major League seasons
Rus